Lucy Russell is an English actress. She made her debut in the film Following (1998) and has appeared in several movies since then. Her most recent appearance is in the movie Toni Erdmann, written and directed by Maren Ade.

Biography
She is known for starring as Grace Elliott in Éric Rohmer's L'Anglaise et le duc (English: The Lady and the Duke). In 2002 she was named as one of European films' "Shooting Stars". Her first starring role was in Christopher Nolan's Following. Since then she has appeared in numerous film and TV roles. Russell and Nolan met as fellow students at University College, London, where she studied Italian. In Batman Begins, another film of Christopher Nolan, Lucy portrayed a restaurant guest who spoke with Bruce Wayne about the Batman. She auditioned and received the role of Angel's personal assistant in the 2007 film Angel. She played Michael Fassbender's sister in the film. 

The short film Daisy, in which she performed the role of Sarah, won for the Best UK Short Film Award at London Independent Film Festival (2016), the Best Foreign Featurette Award at Idyllwild International Festival of Cinema (2016) and the Platinum Remi Award at World Fest Houston International Film Festival (2016). She portrayed as Dee in Murmur, which was nominated for the Best Short Film Award at London Short Film Festival (2016) and the Best Acting Ensemble and Best Short Film Awards at Lift Off London Short Film Festival (2015).

Besides English, Russell fluently speaks French and Italian, and has partial knowledge of German and Spanish languages. She participates in fencing, horse-riding, skiing and ice skating.

She starred in the 2020 eight episode historical drama series Atlantic Crossing as Missy LeHand.

Filmography

References

External links
 

Year of birth missing (living people)
Living people
English film actresses
Alumni of University College London